Paik Sang-hoon (born 7 January 2002) is a South Korean footballer currently playing as a midfielder for FC Seoul.

Club career 
He joined FC Seoul in 2021

He made his league debut on 21 April 2021, against Jeju United

International career 
He was part of the South Korea squad at the 2019 FIFA U-17 World Cup.

Career statistics

Club

Notes

References

External links
 

2002 births
Living people
South Korean footballers
South Korea youth international footballers
Association football midfielders
FC Seoul players